The 2009–10 Toto Cup Leumit was the twenty-eight season of the third most important football tournament in Israel since its introduction and sixth under the current format. It was held in two stages. First, sixteen Liga Leumit teams were divided into four groups. The winners and runners-up, were advanced to the Quarterfinals. Quarterfinals, Semifinals and Finals was held as one-legged matches, with the Final played at Winter Stadium in Ramat Gan. The defending champions were Hapoel Be'er Sheva, making it their third Toto Cup title overall.

It won on 15 December 2009 by Ironi Kiryat Shmona.

Group stage
The matches were played from August 8 to October 11, 2009.

Group A

Group B

Group C

Group D

Elimination rounds

Quarterfinals

Semifinals

Final

See also
 2009–10 Toto Cup Al
 2009–10 Liga Leumit
 2009–10 Israel State Cup

External links
 Official website 

Leumit
Toto Cup Leumit
Israel Toto Cup Leumit